Graham Johncock (born 21 October 1982) is a former professional Australian rules footballer who played for the Adelaide Football Club in the Australian Football League (AFL).

Johncock is an Indigenous Australian from Port Lincoln in South Australia where he currently resides with his partner and four children. Johncock is currently president at his junior club Mallee Park Football Club who compete in the Port Lincoln Football League.

Career highlights

In 2003, Johncock scored the most goals for Adelaide with a total of 30 goals. He won the Showdown Medal in round 5, despite his side's loss.

Johncock was leading the club champion award early in the 2005 season before breaking his leg in a game against  in round 7. He had spent most of these games in defence, but was occasionally pushed forward. He missed a large chunk of the season, but returned before the finals and played a couple of games. He was hampered in the finals, however, by a leg injury.

Johncock retired on 1 July 2013, saying his body could no longer withstand the rigours of AFL.

References

External links

 
 

1982 births
Living people
Adelaide Football Club players
Port Adelaide Magpies players
Indigenous Australian players of Australian rules football
Australian rules footballers from South Australia
People from Port Lincoln
Australia international rules football team players